Sikandar Khanna was an Indian bollywood film director. He died during the making of Phool Khile Hain Gulshan Gulshan.

Filmography

As Director

Nishaan(1983)
Yari Dushmani  (1980)
Phool Khile Hain Gulshan Gulshan  (1978)
Umar Qaid  (1975)
Zinda Dil  (1975)
Prabhat  (1973)

References

Hindi-language film directors